Heinz-Joachim Rothenburg (born 9 April 1944 in Luckenwalde, Brandenburg) is a retired East German shot putter.

He competed for the sports club SC Dynamo Berlin during his active career.

Achievements

References

1944 births
Living people
Sportspeople from Luckenwalde
People from the Province of Brandenburg
East German male shot putters
Olympic athletes of East Germany
Athletes (track and field) at the 1972 Summer Olympics
Athletes (track and field) at the 1976 Summer Olympics
European Athletics Championships medalists